This is a list of progestogens that are or that have been used in clinical or veterinary medicine. They are steroids and include derivatives of progesterone and testosterone.

Progesterone derivatives

Retroprogesterone derivatives

Note that although an active progestogen, retroprogesterone is not medically used.

17α-Hydroxyprogesterone derivatives

Note that 17α-hydroxyprogesterone is inactive as a progestogen and is not used medically.

The 19-norprogesterone derivatives gestonorone caproate (gestronol hexanoate), nomegestrol acetate, segesterone acetate (nestorone, elcometrine), and norgestomet are also derivatives of 17α-hydroxyprogesterone (see below).

17α-Methylprogesterone derivatives

Note that although an active progestogen, 17α-methylprogesterone is not medically used.

The 19-norprogesterone derivatives demegestone, promegestone, and trimegestone are also derivatives of 17α-methylprogesterone (see below).

Other 17α-substituted progesterone derivatives

19-Norprogesterone derivatives

Note that although an active progestogen, 19-norprogesterone is not medically used.

Testosterone derivatives

Note that testosterone itself does not have significant progestogenic activity. Testosterone is instead classified as an anabolic-androgenic steroid and is included here purely because it is the parent structure of this group of progestins.

17α-Ethynyltestosterone derivatives

19-Nortestosterone derivatives

Note that while nandrolone (19-nortestosterone) does have significant progestogenic activity, it is not used as a progestogen. It is instead classified as an androgenic-anabolic steroid and is included here purely because it is an important parent structure of this group of progestins.

17α-Ethynyl-19-nortestosterone derivatives

Estranes

18-Methylestranes (13β-ethylgonanes)

Other 17α-substituted 19-nortestosterone derivatives

Spirolactone derivatives

Note that although an active progestogen, SC-5233 (spirolactone) is not medically used.

See also
 List of steroids
 List of progestogen esters

Notes
? = Chemical names that are unverified.

Further reading
 

Progestogens
Steroids
Progestogens